Feaver is a surname. It is an English surname of Norman French origin, and is an anglicisation of Lefebvre, meaning "smith". Notable people with the surname include:

Douglas Feaver (1914–97), Anglican bishop
John Feaver (born 1952), British tennis player
Peter Feaver (born 1961), American professor of political science
Samuel Russell Feaver (1878–1946), New Zealand farmer, pharmacist, veterinary surgeon and photographer
Vicki Feaver (born 1943), English poet

See also
Fever (disambiguation)